Vic Reeves' House Arrest was a weekly radio comedy series written by and starring Vic Reeves. It was produced by Open Mike Productions and broadcast on BBC Radio 2 It co-starred Reeves' wife Nancy Sorrell, his comedy partner Bob Mortimer, and The Mighty Boosh star, Noel Fielding. It was first broadcast in 2007 in the 1pm slot on Saturday afternoons.

Show format and characters
The show's premise was that Reeves had been put under house arrest for "a crime he didn't commit", each show beginning with him informing listeners of a different ludicrous crime. Each episode consisted of the various events that take place in and around his house on a particular day. Regular occurrences included Reeves waking up the street and inadvertently firing objects into the local vicar's vestry in the process, reading bizarre small ads in the newspaper, watching a television programme, reading his book Nothing but the Sleuth, struggling to stop his records from jumping, and visiting the animal menagerie in his shed. He was also visited by a variety of characters such as Carl - a talkative housecall-making hairdresser (Bob Mortimer), a local vagrant just out of jail and looking for odd jobs (Noel Fielding), and his parole officer (Nancy Sorrell).

In addition to these new characters, the show also featured some characters from previous Vic and Bob series' including "Kinky" John Fowler (Bang Bang, It's Reeves and Mortimer / Catterick) and Davey Stott (Vic Reeves Big Night Out / Bang Bang, It's Reeves and Mortimer). The programme also featured Reeves practising his "club singer"-style vocals (Shooting Stars) in the bath, with the intention of getting on The X Factor.

Episode list

Cast and characters
 Vic Reeves
 Himself
 The vicar
 The fat lad next door
 Father in TV show My Dad, the Moron
 Detective Inspector John "Deacon" Fowler
 Man in TV show Brief Encounters of the Third Kind
 Land of Sport TV show reporter, plus interviewees David Beckham, Frank Monroe and Kevin Welsh
 Nancy Sorrell
 PC Mavis (Vic's parole officer)
 Mother in TV show My Dad, the Moron
 Woman in TV show Brief Encounters of the Third Kind
 Kelly Holmes in Land of Sport TV show
 Bob Mortimer
 Carl the hairdresser
 Davey Stott, presenting Davey Stott's Cooking Pot TV show
 Noel Fielding
 Derek Randolph St. Clair D'beauvois of St James', a vagrant looking for odd jobs
 Peter Serafinowicz
 Terry Wogan

External links
BBC page for the series

BBC Radio 2 programmes
BBC Radio comedy programmes
2007 radio programme debuts